The Trusty Servant is an emblematic figure  in a painting at Winchester College and the name of the college's alumni magazine.

The wall-painting called The Trusty Servant was painted by John Hoskins in 1579. It was reworked by William Cave in 1809, giving the painting now on display there. It hangs outside the kitchen of Winchester College in Hampshire, England.

The American author Arthur Cleveland Coxe (1818-1896) described "the time-honoured Hircocervus, or picture of 'the Trusty-servant,' which hangs near the kitchen, and which emblematically sets forth those virtues in domestics, of which we Americans know nothing. It is a figure, part man, part porker, part deer, and part donkey; with a padlock on his mouth, and various other symbols in his hands and about his person, the whole signifying a most valuable character."

The painting of The Trusty Servant had a didactic function: it is accompanied by allegorical verses that associate the servant's various animal parts with distinctive virtues that the students of Winchester College were meant to follow.

Legacy 

In 2014 Winchester College commissioned a medal by Old Wykehamist Anthony Smith to be awarded to staff in recognition of "Long And Loyal Service". The medal features a relief sculpture of The Trusty Servant as it appears in the painting.

The Trusty Servant is the name of the Winchester College alumni magazine.

There is a Trusty Servant Inn at Minstead in the New Forest.

References 

Fictional hybrid life forms
Fantasy creatures
Winchester College